Semenyih is a town and a mukim in Hulu Langat District in southeastern Selangor, Malaysia along the Kajang–Seremban road.

Etymology
The meaning of the name of the town is uncertain and it does not appear in any dictionary. It was derived from the locals and is related to its past. According to an oral story, it is based from a word in the Negeri Sembilan dialect, meaning "hidden" – the standard Malay word for "hidden" is sembunyi.

Geography
This makes the area home to numerous scenic waterfalls. A more popular tourist attraction in the town is the Ostrich Wonderland Show Farm. The town is becoming more accessible, with new highways (such as the Kajang–Seremban Highway and the Kajang SILK Highway ). New development such as the University of Nottingham Malaysia Campus, has contributed to the growth in population. The 15,100 people recorded in the 1991 census had grown to over 45,000 by 2000. This corresponds to an annual growth rate of 12.9%, compared with the national average of 2.66% over the same period.

Incinerator project
A 1.5 billion ringgit incinerator project was planned for a site between Semenyih and nearby Broga by the federal government. In early 2005, a temporary injunction was issued, stopping work on the project, in response to a lawsuit by residents of the two towns. The project has since been scrapped.

Bandar Sunway Semenyih
Bandar Sunway Semenyih is a new township located along the Kajang-Semenyih road (federal highway 1).

The township construction has been planned in 19 phases. As of 2008 seven phases had been completed. Facilities include a clubhouse with a swimming pool and coffee house. A river runs through the township.

Education

 Sekolah Kebangsaan Semenyih
University of Nottingham Malaysia Campus
 Sekolah Menengah Kebangsaan Bandar Rinching
 Sekolah Kebangsaan Bandar Rinching
 Sekolah Menengah Engku Husain
 Sekolah Kebangsaan Hulu Semenyih
 Tenby Setia Ecohill
 SJK(C) Sin Ming Semenyih
 Maverick International Secondary School

Transportation

Car
Semenyih is mainly served by federal highway 1. Highway 31, traversing the Langat valley, starts here and connects to Bangi, Putrajaya (precinct 20), Dengkil and Banting.

Tolled expressways serving Semenyih include the Kajang-Seremban Expressway (LEKAS) .

Public transportation
Semenyih is served by the UNMC-Kajang Shuttle Bus, going from University of Nottingham's campus near Broga to  Kajang MRT/railway station.

rapidKL bus T450 connect Semenyih town to  Stadium Kajang MRT station.

References

 Kajian Geografi Semenyih (A Study of Semenyih's Geography)
Portal Komuniti Semenyih
 Bandar Sunway Semenyih web.archive.org

External links

Sunway Semenyih Residents association website

Towns in Selangor
Mukims of Selangor
Hulu Langat District